The 2017–18 Houston Baptist Huskies women's basketball team represented Houston Baptist University in the 2017–18 college basketball season. The Huskies, led by fifth year head coach Donna Finnie, played their home games at the Sharp Gymnasium and were members of the Southland Conference. They finished with an overall record of 10–18 and 6–12 in Southland play to finish in tenth place. They failed to qualify for the Southland women's tournament.

Roster
Sources:

Schedule and results

|-
!colspan=9 style="background:#002366; color:#FF7F00;"| Non-Conference Schedule

|-
!colspan=9 style="background:#002366; color:#FF7F00;"| Southland Conference Schedule

See also
2017–18 Houston Baptist Huskies men's basketball team

References

Houston Christian Huskies women's basketball seasons
Houston Baptist
Houston Baptist Huskies basketball
Houston Baptist Huskies basketball